Indera Mahkota is a township in Kuantan, Pahang, Malaysia. This township was opened in 1983. It is once known as Atabara (before it was developed) and now it is a well-developed residential area. Its postal code is 25200. It has 16 areas.

Location
It is also the main road for road users from Kuantan to use the East Coast Expressway (LPT) via Kuantan Interchange. Indera Mahkota is also more accessible to Sultan Haji Ahmad Shah Airport and Gambang/resort city through Kuantan Bypass Highway.

Future development
The relocation plan of the Pahang state administration office to Kotasas, which is located nearby to Indera Mahkota.

References

Populated places established in 1983
Populated places in Pahang
Kuantan